Tephritis volkovitshi is a species of tephritid or fruit flies in the genus Tephritis of the family Tephritidae.

Distribution
Tajikistan.

References

Tephritinae
Insects described in 1995
Diptera of Asia